Albert Taylor Bledsoe (November 9, 1809 – December 8, 1877) was an American Episcopal priest, attorney, professor of mathematics, and officer in the Confederate army and was best known as a staunch defender of slavery and, after the South lost the American Civil War, an architect of the Lost Cause. He was the author of Liberty and Slavery (1856), "the most extensive philosophical treatment of slavery ever produced by a Southern academic", which defended slavery laws as ensuring proper societal order.

Early life and education
Bledsoe was born on November 9, 1809, in Frankfort, Kentucky, the oldest of five children of Moses Owsley Bledsoe and Sophia Childress Taylor (who was a relative of President Zachary Taylor). He was a cadet at the United States Military Academy at West Point from 1825 to 1830, where he was a fellow cadet of Jefferson Davis and Robert E. Lee. After serving two years in the United States Army, he studied law and theology at Kenyon College in Gambier, Ohio, and received his M.A. and LL.M. In 1836. he married Harriet Coxe of Burlington NJ, and they had seven children, four of whom survived childhood.

His daughter was the author Sophia Bledsoe Herrick.

College professor and mathematician
 Adjunct Professor of Mathematics and French, Kenyon College, (OH) 1833–1834.
 Professor of Mathematics, Miami University (OH), 1834–1835.
 Professor of Mathematics and Astronomy, University of Mississippi, 1848–1854.
 Professor of Mathematics, University of Virginia, 1854–1861.
Bledsoe in his lectures at the University of Virginia would frequently "interlard his demonstration of some difficult problem in differential or integral calculus—for example, the lemniscata of —with some vigorous remarks in the doctrine of States' rights". His book The Philosophy of Mathematics was one of the earliest American works on mathematics and includes chapters on Descartes, Leibnitz, and Newton.  Bledsoe is perhaps best remembered for his treatise An Essay on Liberty and Slavery, which presented an extended proslavery argument.  Bledsoe argued that the natural state of humans was in society, not in nature, and that humans in society needed to have restraints on their actions.  That is, he argued that liberty was greatest when humans were allowed to exercise only the amount of freedom they were naturally suited to.  Some had to be restrained; others were entitled to freedom.

Clergyman
In 1835, Bledsoe became an Episcopal minister and became an assistant to Bishop Smith of Kentucky. He abandoned his clerical career in 1838 because of his opposition to infant baptism. Later in life, he was ordained a Methodist minister in 1871, but he never took charge of a church. He was a strenuous advocate of the doctrine of free will and his views are set forth in his book Examination of Edwards on the Will (1845).

Lawyer
In 1838, Bledsoe moved to Springfield, Illinois, where he was a law partner of Edward D. Baker, and where he practiced law in the same courts as Abraham Lincoln and Stephen Douglas. He practiced before the United States Supreme Court in Washington DC from 1840 to 1848.

Confederate official
In 1861, Bledsoe received a commission as a colonel in the Confederate army, and later became Acting Assistant Secretary of War. In 1863 he was sent to London for the purpose of researching various historical problems relating to the North-South conflict, as well as guiding British public opinion in favor of the Confederate cause.

Southern apologist
In 1868 he moved back to the United States and published the Southern Review. He was the "epitome of an unreconstructed Southerner" and published articles defending slavery and secession.

Death
Bledsoe died on December 8, 1877 in Alexandria, Virginia.

Writings
 Examination of Edwards on the Will (1845).
 A Theodicy, or Vindication of the Divine Glory (1853).
 Essay on Liberty and Slavery (1856).
 Is Davis a Traitor? or Was Secession a Constitutional Right previous to the War of 1861?  (1866).
 The Philosophy of Mathematics, with Special Reference to the Elements of Geometry and the Infinitesimal Method (1868).

References

Further reading

 Barnhart, Terry A. (2011). Albert Taylor Bledsoe: Defender of the Old South and Architect of the Lost Cause. Louisiana State University Press (the standard scholarly biography).
 Freeman, Douglas Southall (1939) The South to Posterity: An Introduction to the Writing of Confederate History. New York: Charles Scribner's Sons.
 Herrick, Sophia Bledsoe (1907). "Albert Taylor Bledsoe (1809–1877)." In: Library of Southern Literature, ed. Edwin Andersen Alderman and Joel Chandler Harris, Vol. I. New Orleans/Atlanta/Dallas: The Martin and Hoyt Company, pp. 395–399.
 Hubbell, Jay B. (1954). The South in American Literature, 1607–1900. Durham, N.C.: Duke University Press.
 McCorkle, William P. (1891). "Bledsoe's Theory of Moral Freedom," The Presbyterian Quarterly, Vol. V, pp. 229–242.
 Steel, Samuel Augustus (1925). "Albert Taylor Bledsoe." In: Eminent Men I Met Along the Sunny Road. Nashville: Cokesbury Press, pp. 30–55.
 Tillett, Wilbur F. (1893). "Albert Taylor Bledsoe," The Methodist Review, Vol. XIV, No. 2, pp. 219–242.
 Weaver, R. M. (1944). "Albert Taylor Bledsoe," The Sewanee Review, Vol. LII, No. 1, pp. 34–45.
 Woodworth, Stephen E. (1999). "Bledsoe, Albert Taylor." In: American National Biography, Vol. III, pp. 11–12.

External links

 
 
 The Southern Review, at Hathi Trust
Biography of Albert Taylor Bledsoe at Answers.com
Biography of Albert Taylor Bledsoe at the University of Virginia
Biography of Albert Taylor Bledsoe from the Encyclopedia of World Biography
Biography on Albert Taylor Bledsoe from the Kentucky Historical Society
Fact sheet on Albert Taylor Bledsoe from the United States Military Academy
Entry on Bledsoe, Albert Taylor at the New Schaff-Herzog Encyclopedia of Religious Knowledge

1809 births
1877 deaths
People from Frankfort, Kentucky
Kenyon College alumni
Confederate States Army officers
Illinois lawyers
American magazine publishers (people)
United States Army officers
United States Military Academy alumni
American proslavery activists
Kenyon College faculty
19th-century American mathematicians
Miami University faculty
University of Mississippi faculty
University of Virginia faculty
19th-century American Episcopalians
American Methodist clergy
Neo-Confederates
American Episcopal clergy
19th-century American lawyers
19th-century Methodists
19th-century American clergy